"The Day Before Atlanta" is an American television play broadcast on April 9, 1959, as part of the CBS television series, Playhouse 90.  The cast is led by Jack Warden. Ralph Nelson is the director and John Gay the writer.

Plot
During the American Civil War, a Union scouting party kills a man and his teenage son as they attempt to defend their plantation. A soldier discovers a young girl hiding inside the mansion.

Cast
The cast includes the following:

 Jack Warden - Sgt. Jubal Banks
 Timmy Everett - Doug Hooker
 Betty Lou Keim - Carolyn Claybourne
 Clu Gulager - Zach Toombs
 Dabbs Greer - Clayton Beard
 Clinton Sundberg - Matthew Claybourne
 Gavin Gordon ... Cast, Slade Simpson
 Musa Williams - Esther
 Joel Fluellen - Jonathan
 William Schallert - Major Barnes
 Tom McKee - General McPherson
 Roy Jenson - the Lieutenant
 Jayson Wingreen - Ralph Fletcher
 Nolan Leary - Edwin
 Donald Harrison - Tom

Production
The program aired on April 9, 1959, on the CBS television series Playhouse 90. John Gay was the writer and Ralph Nelson the director.

References

1959 American television episodes
Playhouse 90 (season 3) episodes
1959 television plays